Glenn Jobe Jr. (born March 4,1951) is an American biathlete. He competed in the 20 km individual event at the 1980 Winter Olympics.

He designed and with his wife, Edith, started the cross-country ski areas of Kirkwood and Tahoe Donner, and ran the biathlon program at Auburn Ski Club.   He was inducted into the University of Nevada's Wolf Pack Hall of Fame in 2002. He has played a pivotal role in the advancement of cross-country skiing and biathlon in the Sierra region. He is considered one of North America's leading experts on cross-country classic skiing techniques.

References

External links
 Glenn Jobe: Journey to Olympics and beyond at YouTube
 

1951 births
Living people
American male biathletes
Olympic biathletes of the United States
Biathletes at the 1980 Winter Olympics
Sportspeople from Stockton, California